Lanzo d'Intelvi was a comune (municipality) in the Province of Como in the Italian region Lombardy, located about  north of Milan and about  north of Como, on the border with Switzerland. It has been frazione of Alta Valle Intelvi since 2017.

This place near the Swiss border, It was chosen by rich Milan people of the early XX century to built their own Summer mansions. In Lanzo d'Intelvi there are a lot of old luxury liberty villas still original in their own aspects.

There was a train to go to the lake of Lugano and then to Lugano with the boat. This Mountain train Is going to be replace with a new One, Building again another strong turistic environment.

Cities and towns in Lombardy